Maurice O'Connor Drury (known as 'Con Drury' to his friends) (3 July 1907 – 25 December 1976) was a psychiatrist and follower of Ludwig Wittgenstein born in Marlborough, Wiltshire, England of Irish parents.  He grew up in Exeter, Devon, England, where his father, Henry D'Olier Drury, who had been a teacher in Marlborough college, retired.

Education
Drury was educated at Exeter Grammar School. He then studied philosophy at Trinity College, Cambridge. His tutors included G. E. Moore, C. D. Broad and Ludwig Wittgenstein. Drury became Wittgenstein's friend for many years to come, until the latter's death in 1951.

After graduation Drury entered the Cambridge theological college Westcott House, leaving after one year. He then enrolled in the medical school in Trinity College Dublin, graduating in 1939.

Medical career
Drury joined the Royal Army Medical Corps, serving in Egypt and taking part in the Normandy landings. After his demobilisation, Drury worked as a House Physician in a hospital in Taunton. In 1947 he was appointed Resident Psychiatrist at St Patrick's Hospital Dublin. From 1951 he also worked in a subsidiary nursing home, St Edmundbury, Lucan, Dublin. He lectured medical students on psychology in Trinity College and the Royal College of Surgeons. He is described as relating to his student audience as "quite an intellectual man, who was very much speaking and relating to an audience as an intellectual." He was promoted to Senior Consultant Psychiatrist in 1969. In 1970 due to anginal pain he moved to a private residence in Dublin.

Personal life
He married the matron of St Patrick's Hospital, Eileen Herbert, in 1951. One of his children, Luke Drury a physicist, was elected president of the Royal Irish Academy in 2011.
His second son Paul was one of Ireland's most prominent newspaper editors, editing The Star, Evening Herald, Irish Daily Mail, and Ireland on Sunday. He was also deputy editor of the Irish Independent. He died in 2015.

Writings
Drury was the author of "The danger of words and writings on Wittgenstein" (also published as "The Danger of Words" and, in French, as "Conversations avec Ludwig Wittgenstein" as translated by Jean-Pierre Cometti).  A volume collecting many of his writings has been edited by John Hayes and published by Bloomsbury in 2017. His papers are on deposit in the library of Mary Immaculate College Limerick.

Philosophy
Drury's book, "The Danger of Words" has been described by Ray Monk as 'the most truly Wittgensteinian book published by any of Wittgenstein's students'. Drury brought Wittgenstein's "critique of language" to bear on the practice of medicine, and particularly psychology that promised the same control over the mind that physics achieved with matter. This promise, pointed out Drury, was one where the delivery date was always being pushed into the future.

References

External links 

Mention of Maurice O'Connor Drury in a correspondence of the British Journal of Psychiatry
Dr Silvia Lanzetta "Maurice O’Connor Drury: the inheritance of Wittgenstein"
 Con Drury, Wittgenstein’s Irish interpreter 2017 article by John Hayes for The Irish Times
Entries on Drury at the Irish Philosophy site of Cathy M. Barry.

1907 births
1976 deaths
Alumni of Trinity College, Cambridge
Alumni of Trinity College Dublin
Alumni of Westcott House, Cambridge
British Army personnel of World War II
British psychiatrists
English people of Irish descent
Irish philosophers
Irish psychiatrists
Medical doctors from Exeter
Royal Army Medical Corps officers
Wittgensteinian philosophers